Uma Rosa com Amor is a Brazilian telenovela produced and broadcast by TV Globo. It premiered on 23 October 1972 and ended on 29 June 1973, with a total of 221 episodes. It's the eleventh "novela das sete" to be aired at the timeslot. It is created by Vicente Sesso and directed by Walter Campos.

Cast

References

External links 
 

1972 telenovelas
Brazilian telenovelas
TV Globo telenovelas
1972 Brazilian television series debuts
1973 Brazilian television series endings
Portuguese-language telenovelas